Cirsium texanum is a species of plants in the tribe Cardueae within the family Asteraceae found in North America. Common names include Texas thistle, Texas purple thistle or southern thistle. The species is native to northern Mexico (Coahuila, Durango, Nuevo León, San Luis Potosí, Tamaulipas) and the southern Great Plains of the south-central United States (primarily Texas, Oklahoma, and eastern New Mexico with additional populations in Louisiana, Arkansas, and Missouri).

Cirsium texanum is a biennial or perennial herb up to 80 cm (32 inches) tall. Leaves have small, narrow spines along the edges. Flower heads are sometimes produced one at a time, sometimes in small groups, each head with light purple disc florets but no ray florets.

References

External links
Photo of herbarium specimen at Missouri Botanical Garden, collected in Coahuila

texanum
Flora of North America
Plants described in 1862